CBR-FM is a Canadian radio station, broadcasting on 102.1 FM in Calgary, Alberta. It broadcasts the programming of the CBC Music network. CBR-FM's studios are located on Westmount Boulevard Northwest just west of downtown Calgary, while its transmitter is located at 85th Street Southwest and Old Banff Coach Road in western Calgary. CBR-FM was launched on September 29, 1975.

The jazz program Tonic, hosted by Tim Tamashiro, originated from CBR-FM. It previously hosted only the weekend version until the retirement of Montreal-based weekday host Katie Malloch in 2012.

As of Winter 2020, CBR-FM is the 14th-most-listened-to radio station in the Calgary market according to a PPM data report released by Numeris.

Rebroadcasters

References

External links
 
 
 

BR-FM
BR-FM
Radio stations established in 1975
1975 establishments in Alberta